Pascaline Crêvecoeur (born 30 April 1982) is a French-speaking actress in both cinema and theatre.

She graduated from Insas, National Institute of Performing Arts - Brussels/Belgium, in 2007.

Filmography

Cinema

Television

Musical videos

Theatre

French dubbing

Cinema

Television

Commercials

External links 
 
 Allociné
 Allodoublage
 Comedien.be
 Official Site

1982 births
Living people
Actresses from Brussels
Belgian television actresses
French television actresses
20th-century Belgian actresses
21st-century Belgian actresses
20th-century French actresses